The 1919 Bucknell football team was an American football team that represented Bucknell University as an independent during the 1919 college football season. In its first season under head coach Pete Reynolds, the team compiled a 5–4–1 record.

Schedule

References

Bucknell
Bucknell Bison football seasons
Bucknell football